is a private women's junior college in Inagi, Tokyo, Japan. The precursor of the school was founded in 1928, and it was chartered as a university in 1965.

External links 
 Official website in Japanese

Private universities and colleges in Japan
Educational institutions established in 1928
Universities and colleges in Tokyo
Japanese junior colleges
1928 establishments in Japan
Women's universities and colleges in Japan
Inagi, Tokyo